is a Japanese publishing company headquartered in Suginami, Tokyo Prefecture, Japan. The company mainly publishes novels based on adult visual novel video games.

External links
Paradigm's official website 

Book publishing companies in Tokyo